Alexandra Mazur (born 1986 in Moscow) was elected The Beauty of Russia in July 2006, while competing with 44 other contestants from various regions of Russia. During the pageant, she represented her home city of Moscow. 

She competed for Russia at the Miss World 2006 pageant in Warsaw, Poland on September 30.
She also represented Russia at the Miss International 2007 pageant in Tokyo, Japan on October 15 where she made the top 15.

External links
 Moscow Girl (in Russian)

1986 births
Living people
Miss International 2007 delegates
Miss World 2006 delegates
Russian female models
Russian beauty pageant winners